Niveotectura is a genus of sea snails, the true limpets, marine gastropod mollusks in the family Lottiidae.

Species
Species within the genus Niveotectura include:

 Niveotectura funiculata (Carpenter, 1864)
 Niveotectura pallida (Gould, 1859)

References

External links

Lottiidae
Monotypic gastropod genera